Thampuran may refer to:

Aikya Keralam Thampuran (1870–1948), Maharaja (king) of Cochin, ruled between 1946 and 1949
Kelappan Thampuran (cricketer, born 1925)
Kelappan Thampuran (Kerala cricketer) (born 1937), Indian cricketer
Kelappan Thampuran (Travancore-Cochin cricketer) (born 1937), former Indian first-class cricketer
Kerala Varma Valiya Koil Thampuran CSI (1845–1914), Malayalam-language poet and translator from the Indian state of Kerala
Kochunny Thampuran (born 1937), Indian cricketer
Kodungallur Kunjikkuttan Thampuran (1864–1914), Malayalam poet and Sanskrit scholar lived in Kerala, India
Kunhikuttan Thampuran (1864–1913), Indian poet from Kodungallur, Kerala
Kunjikkuttan Thampuran (actor), Malayalam film actor, Kathakali artist and writer
Maharaja Ravi Varma Kunjappan Thampuran or Ravi Varma V (1865–1946), the Maharaja of Cochin, India in 1943–46
Midukkan Thampuran or Kerala Varma VI GCIE (1863–1943), the ruler of the Kingdom of Cochin from 1941 to 1943
Raja Raja Varma Koil Thampuran, Malayalam language poet and translator from the Indian state of Kerala
Rama Varma Kochaniyan Thampuran (1912–2014), Indian royal, who was the Valiya Thampuran or oldest male member of the Cochin Royal Family
Rama Varma Parikshith Thampuran (died 1964), the last official ruler of the Cochin princely state
Sakthan Thampuran (1751–1805), or Rama Varma IX, popularly known as Sakthan Thampuran, ruler of the Kingdom of Cochin
Virulam Thampuran (died 1828), (regnal name: Kerala Varma III), Indian monarch who ruled the Kingdom of Cochin from 1809 to 1828

See also
Ramavarma Appan Thampuran Memorial, established in 1976 at Ayyanthole, Thrissur city in Kerala in memory of Ramavarma Appan Thampuran
Sakthan Thampuran Nagar, business district of Thrissur city in Kerala state, South India
Shakthan Thampuran Palace, situated in City of Thrissur in Kerala state, India
Sakthan Thampuran Bio-Waste Treatment Plant, in Kerala, India, converts waste into manure
Shaktan Thampuran Private Bus Stand, private bus terminal in Kerala, India
Aaraam Thampuran (transl. The Sixth Lord) is a 1997 Indian Malayalam-language action drama film
Ente Ponnu Thampuran, 1992 Indian Malayalam film
Koyi Thampuran, the title of the Prince Consorts of the Queens and Princesses of Travancore
Naranathu Thampuran, 2001 Indian Malayalam-language film